Charles Spencer Francis (June 17, 1853 – December 1, 1911) was an American diplomat and newspaper editor.

Early life and education
The son of diplomat and newspaper publisher John M. Francis and Harriet E. Tucker, Charles Spencer Francis was born on June 17, 1853. He studied at Cornell University from 1870 to 1871, before joining his father in Greece as his secretary. His mission completed, Francis thus returned to the United States and Cornell in 1874.

At Cornell, Francis proved to be an excellent rower, setting the world record in intercollegiate single scull competition in 1876 (which stood long after his death, up until his grandson also attended Cornell). He graduated from Cornell the next year with a Bachelor of Science degree.

Newspaperman
He went to work for his father's newspaper, The Troy Times, as a reporter, and worked his way up to the editor's desk. He bought a stake in the paper, then made it an equal one. Upon his father's death in 1897, Francis took over the paper entirely.

Diplomatic career
Francis, a Republican, was appointed to his father's old post of United States Minister to Greece, Serbia, and Romania in 1900, under President William McKinley. Two years later, Francis resigned to attend to his newspaper and other business interests.

He returned to diplomacy in 1906, when President Theodore Roosevelt nominated Francis to another of his father's old posts: that of the United States Ambassador to Austria—at the time, the United States Ambassador to Austria-Hungary; upon the recall of Bellamy Storer. The Emperor, Franz Joseph, accepted; and his appointment was announced by the Foreign Ministry on March 28, 1906. Two months later, Francis presented his credentials.

He was officially introduced to the Emperor's court on January 30, 1907. Three years later, on the eve of his departure, the Emperor received him in a farewell audience.

He was replaced by Richard C. Kerens.

Other activities
A member of Zeta Psi, he served in the New York State National Guard under Joseph Bradford Carr, ultimately attaining the rank of colonel. He was also a vice president of the American Scenic and Historic Preservation Society, and a member of Sons of the Revolution.

In 1903, Francis became a member of the Board of Regents of the University of the State of New York, which he resigned upon his nomination as ambassador.

Personal life
Francis married Alice Evans, the daughter of a Cornell professor, on May 23, 1878; and they had five children, two sons and three daughters.

Francis died from myocarditis on December 1, 1911, and was buried at Oakwood Cemetery.

References

External links

Charles Spencer Francis at the Office of the Historian

Ambassadors of the United States to Greece
Ambassadors of the United States to Austria
Ambassadors of the United States to Serbia
Ambassadors of the United States to Romania
1853 births
1911 deaths
Businesspeople from Troy, New York
Military personnel from Troy, New York
New York National Guard personnel
Regents of the University of the State of New York
Editors of New York (state) newspapers
Cornell Big Red rowers
New York (state) Republicans
19th-century American businesspeople